= Lane Creek =

Willow Creek tributary in Oregon, US

Coordinates: 42°23′22″N 122°58′30″W

Lane Creek is a stream in the U.S. state of Oregon. It is a tributary to Willow Creek.

Lane Creek was named for a pioneer citizen named Lane who was killed near its course.
